Belfry High School is a high school in Belfry, Kentucky, United States. The school is located in the northeastern region of Pike County, approximately 22 miles northeast of Pikeville, Kentucky and 1 mile south of Williamson, West Virginia. The school moved from Belfry in 2005 to a new site 3 miles north near the West Virginia border in Goody, Kentucky. The school is one of five public high schools in the Pike County Public School System and one of six public high schools in Pike County.

History 
Belfry High School was established in 1923 and located along U.S. Route 119. Then in 2005, Belfry High School constructed a new larger building and opened that year while the old Belfry High School became Belfry Middle School. The new Belfry High School's campus consisted of a main building and an athletic complex. In 2006, the Freshman Academy was established. The academy was ended in 2011.

Notable alumni 
 Janet Stumbo (1972): first woman from the 7th Judicial District to be elected to the Kentucky Court of Appeals; first woman elected to the Kentucky Supreme Court

References

External links 

Schools in Pike County, Kentucky
Public high schools in Kentucky
Educational institutions established in 1924
1924 establishments in Kentucky